Hammatolobium is a genus of flowering plants in the legume family Fabaceae. It belongs to the subfamily Faboideae.

References 

Loteae
Fabaceae genera